Morgenzon (Dutch for morning sun) is a ghost town situated on the banks of the Osspruit River (Ox Stream) with an agricultural school (which is all the town is known for) in Mpumalanga province, South Africa. The town is 45 km south-west of Ermelo and 35 km south-east of Bethal and is notable for the bad road infrastructure when passing through the town. Although, during the past year or two (2021/2022) the road is in better shape than those of the surrounding towns as the road is maintained regularly,thus far.

Bosbok Pharmacy in Morgenzon, with its very own pharmacist, is available to relieve the need for medication, as well as small gifts, stationery, toiletries etc.

VKB Landbou has a branch in Morgenzon.  Konic's Tyres opened a mini branch in town, and as with almost every other small town, one will find a PEP Stores.

The town also has its own Supermarket, Morgenzon Supermarket, with a separate Hardware department which will not leave one stuck when it comes to the kitchen cupboards and hardware needs.

You can fill up at any one of two filling stations, one of which also has a hardware department and quickshop.

A recently new butchery, Miella's Meat Market, a fresh produce shop, other hardware and general shops also cover basic needs of residents.

History
The town was laid out in 1912 on the farm Morgenzon and has been administered by a village council since 1920. Named after the farm, Morgenzon is Dutch for ‘morning sun’. It was established around the Marnico Hotel which was built in 1912 on a wagon stopover between Standerton and Ermelo, Mpumalanga.and our main street is 5th street at Maseko (186)

During the early 1990s, Morgenzon was the site of a failed attempt to set up a homeland for white South Africans. The idea originated in the early 1980s, when Hendrik Verwoerd Jr, son of the former prime minister Hendrik Verwoerd, moved to Morgenzon along with a group known as Oranjewerkers.

Ultimately only 20 families followed him, as his plans required them to give up their black servants and labourers, and most of Morgenzon's whites were reluctant to perform the menial tasks that were otherwise reserved for blacks.

See also
 Owendale, Northern Cape
 Balmoral, Mpumalanga

References

Populated places in the Lekwa Local Municipality
Populated places founded by Afrikaners
Populated places established in 1912
Intentional communities in South Africa
1912 establishments in South Africa